Sebring may refer to:

People
 Harold Sebring (1898–1968; aka Tom Sebring), an American judge, Florida Supreme Court justice
 George E. Sebring, founder of Sebring, Ohio, USA
 Henry Orvel Sebring, founder of Sebring, Florida, USA
 Janette Sebring Lowrey (1892–1986; born Janette Sebring), U.S. children's author
 Jay Sebring (1933–1969), an American celebrity hair stylist
 Jimmy Sebring (1882–1909), American baseball player
 Steven Sebring (born 1966), American filmmaker
 William Sebring Kirkpatrick (1844–1932), U.S. politician

Places
 Sebring, Florida, a city in Highlands County, Florida, United States
 Sebring Downtown Historic District
 Hendricks Army Airfield, a WWII Army Airfield at Sebring, that became a racetrack and civilian airport
 Sebring International Raceway, a road course auto racing facility in the southeastern United States
 Sebring Regional Airport, a public use airport six nautical miles southeast of Sebring, Florida
 Sebring station, a rail station
 Sebring, Florida metropolitan area
 H. Orvel Sebring House (Sebring House), an NRHP listed building
 Sebring High School, Sebring, Florida, USA
 Lake Sebring, a freshwater lake in Highlands County, Florida, United States
 Sebring, Ohio, a village in Mahoning County, Ohio, United States

Motorsports races
 12 Hours of Sebring, an annual motorsport endurance race for sports cars held at Sebring International Raceway; the most famous Sebring race (the "at Sebring" race, generally)
 1000 Miles of Sebring, a sports car race held at Sebring International Raceway
 Grand Prix of Sebring, a sports car race held at Sebring International Raceway

Transportation
 Chrysler Sebring, a line of mid-size automobiles that was sold from 1995 through 2010
 Maserati Sebring, a two-door 2+2 coupé manufactured from 1962 until 1968
 Trekking Sebring, a paraglider
 Motobecane/Motomarina Sebring, a moped sold in the 1980s and built by Morini Franco Motori
 Seabring 1948 Monoplane, an airplane, see List of aircraft (Se)
 Sebring (sports car), a British sports car marque

Other uses
 Sebring (horse) (2005–2019), a top class two-year-old Australian Thoroughbred racehorse

See also

 Sebringville, Ontario, Canada